The 2022 Georgia Southern Eagles baseball team represented Georgia Southern University during the 2022 NCAA Division I baseball season. The Eagles played their home games at J. I. Clements Stadium and were led by twenty-second year head coach Rodney Hennon. They were members of the Sun Belt Conference.

Preseason

Sun Belt Conference Coaches Poll
The Sun Belt Conference Coaches Poll was released on February 9, 2022. Georgia Southern was picked to finish second with 118 votes.

Preseason All-Sun Belt Team & Honors

Miles Smith (USA, Sr, Pitcher)
Hayden Arnold (LR, Sr, Pitcher)
Tyler Tuthill (APP, Jr, Pitcher)
Brandon Talley (LA, Sr, Pitcher)
Caleb Bartolero (TROY, Jr, Catcher)
Jason Swan (GASO, Sr, 1st Base)
Luke Drumheller (APP, Jr, 2nd Base)
Eric Brown (CCU, Jr, Shortstop)
Ben Klutts (ARST, Sr, 3rd Base)
Christian Avant (GASO, Sr, Outfielder)
Josh Smith (GSU, Jr, Outfielder)
Rigsby Mosley (TROY, Sr, Outfielder)
Cameron Jones (GSU, So, Utility)
Noah Ledford (GASO, Jr, Designated Hitter)

Personnel

Schedule and results

Schedule Source:
*Rankings are based on the team's current ranking in the D1Baseball poll.

Statesboro Regional

Postseason

Rankings

References

Georgia Southern
Georgia Southern Eagles baseball seasons
Georgia Southern Eagles baseball
Georgia Southern